Matins is the canonical hour ending at dawn in the Roman Catholic monastic Liturgy of the Hours.

Matins may also refer to:

Religion
 Orthros, the equivalent office in the Eastern Churches
 Matins Gospel, the solemn chanting of a passage from the Four Gospels during Matins in the Orthodox and Byzantine Rite Eastern Catholic churches
 Morning Prayer (Anglican), often called Matins or Mattins
 Matins in Lutheranism, a morning order

Poetry
 "Matins", the first of seven poems in the series "Horae Canonicae" by Scottish poet Donald Davie (1922–1995)
 Matins, a collection of thirty poems by Canadian poet Francis Joseph Sherman (1871–1926) published in 1896
  "Matins", any of seven non-sequential poems in Louise Glück's 1992 book, The Wild Iris

See also

 Matin (disambiguation)